Telekamery awards are Polish awards presented annually by TeleTydzień magazine since 1998. Its ceremonies were broadcast by TVP2 between 1998–2009 and 2015–2016, and by TV Puls in 2020. The 2010 ceremony was streamed via Interia.pl. In other years, ceremonies were not broadcast.

The winners of three Telekamerys are honoured with a Golden Telekamery Award, and cannot be nominated for an award anymore meaning one person/show/channel can win up to three awards.

Winners

1998

1999

2000

2001

2002

2003

2004

2005

2006

2007

2008

2009

2010

2011

2012

2013

2014

2015

2016

2017

2018

2019

2020

Golden Telekamery

References

External links
Official website

Polish awards
Awards established in 1998